Dysdera aculeata is a spider species found from Central Asia. It has been introduced in Croatia.

See also 
 List of Dysderidae species

References

External links 

Dysderidae
Spiders of Asia
Spiders of Europe
Spiders described in 1875